"High School in Jakarta" is a song by Indonesian singer-songwriter Niki. It was released by 88rising as the third and final single from her second studio album, Nicole (2022), on 5 August 2022.

Music videos
A music video premiered on YouTube during the release, and it depicts Niki as a high school version of herself.

The music video was filmed at Palisades Charter High School in Pacific Palisades, Los Angeles, California, United States.

Charts

References 

2022 singles
2022 songs